The Recruit is the first novel in the CHERUB series, written by Robert Muchamore. It introduces most of the main characters, such as James Adams (formerly Choke), Lauren Adams (formerly Onions), Kyle Blueman, and Kerry Chang. It was released in the United Kingdom by Hodder Children's Books on 30 April 2004, and by Simon Pulse in the United States on 30 August 2005.

Plot 
Eleven-year-old James Choke accidentally slashes classmate Samantha Jennings' face with a nail on the wall after she teases him about his mother's obesity. He shoves his teacher over and runs home to find his stepfather Ronald "Ron" Onions visiting his mother, Gwen. Later that night, James discovers that his mother has died after consuming alcohol while taking painkillers. James is sent to a children's home called Nebraska House, where he shares a room with thirteen-year-old CHERUB agent Kyle Blueman. Lauren is taken to live with her father Ron, who dislikes James and doesn't allow him to visit her. Contrary to Kyle's advice, James befriends Rob Vaughn and his friends. A few weeks later, on his twelfth birthday, James is called into the police station, where he receives a caution for assaulting Samantha Jennings and his teacher, Cassandra Voolt. Later that night, Rob and his cronies convince him to steal a pack of beer from an off-licence. The shopkeeper catches him after two of Rob's cronies block the door, preventing James from escaping. He is escorted to the police station, where he is placed in a cell and his statement recorded.

The next morning, James awakes in a room at the CHERUB campus. Chairman Dr. Terrence "Mac" McAfferty introduces him to CHERUB and puts him through a series of entrance tests. He passes the tests and is sent back to Nebraska House to decide whether or not he wants to join. Upon returning to CHERUB, Kyle shows James his new room, and he meets his handler, Meryl Spencer. In her office, he chooses his new name, James Robert Anthony Adams. He is given a physical assessment and told to run 30kilometers per week and learn how to swim. 

A few days after arriving at CHERUB campus, Kyle sneaks him onto a one-day mission in London to visit Lauren. Three weeks later, he and seven other recruits begin Basic Training, a rigorous 100-day course designed to prepare CHERUB agents for missions, and is paired up with Kerry Chang. Despite nearly quitting after spending Christmas night outside in their underwear, they both pass. Shortly after arriving back on campus, he finds out that Lauren has joined CHERUB as well and Ron has been sentenced to nine years in jail for physically abusing her and selling contraband cigarettes.

Two months later, Amy tells James that their swimming lessons are over, and they have a mission together. Overseen by mission controller Ewart Asker, they are to stay with Cathy Dunn at Fort Harmony, a hippy commune in Wales. There, they discover that brothers Fire and World Dunn are planning an anthrax attack against 200 oil executives and politicians, James is found to touch the anthrax and is hospitalised until he is told that there was no harm in that type of anthrax., at Petrocon, an oil conference held in the nearby Green Brooke Conference Centre. They successfully prevent the attack, although accomplice Brian "Bungle" Evans manages to escape. For his exemplary job in the mission, James is awarded a navy CHERUB T-shirt.

Characters

Development and publication 
Development for both The Recruit and the CHERUB series as a whole began in 1999 when Muchamore was visiting his sister in Australia and found his twelve-year-old nephew complaining about the lack of any good reading material. In 2001, Muchamore began working on an unnamed novel, KN1 (Kids novel 1). This draft was more violent than the published version, with James slashing Samantha's face open with broken glass. Robert Muchamore didn't approach a literary agent until Autumn 2002. By this time the novel was called CHERUB 1.0. He was rejected by the first agent but taken on by the second. Many different publishing companies disliked the novel and rejected Muchamore once again. In March 2003, Hodder Children's Books purchased CHERUB 1.0 and an unnamed sequel, both for release in 2004.

Translation 
The Recruit has been translated into 20 languages, including:
Czech - Nováček (The Novice)
Chinese - 愤怒的城堡 (Angry Castle)
French - 100 Jours en Enfer (100 Days In Hell)
German - Top Secret: Der Agent (Top Secret: The agent)
Japanese - スカウト (Scout)
Polish - Rekrut
Portuguese - O Recruta
Russian - Новобранец (The Rookie)
Spanish - Entrenamiento Básico (Basic Training)
Norwegian - Rekrutten
Danish - Ilddåb (Firebirth)
Dutch - Top Secret
Hebrew - מלאך: הגיוס (Angel: The Recruitment)

Adaptations

Graphic novel

A graphic novel adaption of the book, adapted by Ian Edginton and illustrated by John Aggs, was released on 4 August 2012 by Hodder Children's Books.

Audio book
A 3-CD audiobook was released in the UK on 21 September 2006, read by Julian Rhind-Tutt.

Critical reception
The Recruit received generally good reviews, and was nominated for eight awards, seven of which it won.
The Sunday Express described the book as "punchy, exciting, glamorous and, what's more, you'll completely wish it was true".

Awards

References

External links
  for the UK edition
  for the US edition

CHERUB novels
2004 British novels
Hodder & Stoughton books
Eco-terrorism in fiction
Anthrax in fiction
2004 debut novels